Otley is a village and civil parish in the English county of Suffolk. The B1079 road runs through the village, meeting the B1078 to the south of the parish at Otley Green.

The village has a number of amenities, including a shop, public house, village hall, doctors surgery and two churches. The village primary school is small and educates around 50 pupils. In the south of the parish, Suffolk Rural College delivers a range of agricultural and other vocational courses. The college originally opened in 1970 as Otley College of Agriculture and Horticulture and became part of Ipswich-based Suffolk New College in 2020.

Otley Hall, a 15th-century Grade I listed house which was historically the seat of the family of Bartholomew Gosnold, is to the north of the village. To the south of the village is a motte and bailey castle site and a Roman road crossed the parish towards its southern boundary. The parish church is dedicated to St Mary the Virgin and dates from the 15th century. It has what is believed to be one of the oldest total immersion baptismal font in any English Anglican church. The church is a Grade II* listed building.

Otley Baptist Chapel is situated on Chapel Road and dates from 1800. The building was significantly enlarged in the 1830s, at which point it became a Strict Baptist chapel. On the morning of 30 March 1851 it had a congregation of 462, over four times that of the Anglican church, with another congregation, of 562, in the afternoon. The modern chapel seats 500.

Otley is the birthplace of Roger Osborne who scored the only goal of the game in the 1978 FA Cup Final for Ipswich Town. It was also for many years, the home of Percy Edwards, famous for his impressions of birds and other animal noises.

Notes

References

External links

Otley Village website
Otley Hall website

Villages in Suffolk
Civil parishes in Suffolk